The Apple Color Plus 14″ Display is a 14″ (11.9″ viewable) shadow mask CRT that was manufactured by Apple Inc. from October 21, 1993, until August 7, 1995.  It was typically bundled with Macintosh Performa models. The video cable uses a standard Macintosh DA-15 video connector and the fixed resolution is 640x480.

References 
 EveryMac.com

Apple Inc. peripherals
Apple Inc. displays